Ducal hat may refer to:
 Ducal hat of Liechtenstein, a former crown of the Princes of Liechtenstein
 Ducal hat of Styria
 Herzogshut, the ducal hat of a Herzog

es:Birreta Germánica